Karvelis is a Lithuanian language family name. It may refer to:
Ugnė Karvelis (1935–2002), Lithuanian writer and translator
Juozas Karvelis (1934–2018), Lithuanian politician
Petras Karvelis, Foreign Minister of Lithuania (1925-1929)

 
Lithuanian-language surnames